Chilecebus is an extinct genus of New World monkeys that lived in what is now Chile (Abanico Formation) during the Early Miocene some 20 million years ago. The type species is C. carrascoensis.

See also 
 List of fossil primates of South America

References 

Prehistoric monkeys
Prehistoric primate genera
Miocene primates of South America
Colhuehuapian
Neogene Chile
Fossils of Chile
Fossil taxa described in 1995